Mansanpally is a village and panchayat in Ranga Reddy district, TS, India. It falls under Maheswaram mandal.

References

Villages in Ranga Reddy district